Vemulawada Bhima alias 'Vemulawada Bheemakavi' was a hugely popular Telugu poet (11th century AD) for his style of poetry and is considered to be a demi-god for his powers.

The poet's life was mentioned in the first of its kind, 1829 AD 's work- 'Biographical Sketches of Dekkan Poets' - by Cavelly Venkata Ramaswamie.

The same poet was referred as Vemulawada, Vemulaada, Lemulawada, and Lemulaada Bheema kavi.

Early life 
The poet was born at Vemula Vada, in the province of Veligandala (Karimnagar).  He was born to a widow who is a Lema (a young woman) with the blessings of the Vemulawada Bheemeshwara Swamy.

The poet lived in the 11th century or between 12th-13th centuries.

He travelled to different foreign countries, such as Karnata, Maharatta, Sajanagar (near Peddapuram, East Godavari district which was ruled by Kalingas and Eastern Chalukyas or Vengi Chalukyas).

Birth Place Controversy 
First Generation scholar (1829) Cavelly Venkata Ramaswamie in his 1829 work identifies him with Lemulawada (Vemulawada, Karimnagar district). Majority of next generation scholars (1900s) such as Manavalli Ramakrishna kavi, Jayanti Ramayya Pantulu, Seshadri Ramana Kavulu too place him to be a native of Vemulawada, Karimnagar district (alias Lemulavada) due to the below majority evidences. The Kendra Sahitya Academy also opines the same.

The same poet was referred as Vemulawada, Vemulaada, Lemulawada, and Lemulaada Bheema kavi. The above four names are colloquial names of Vemulawada, Karimnagar district even till today.

A minority of new generation scholars probably who have no knowledge of Vemulawada, Karimnagar confused with Vemulawada, East Godavari district (originally called Vengulawada' and not 'Vemgulawada'. In Telugu, half circle represents lost nasal 'n' and full circle represents 'm')

References to Lemulawada & Chitrakutam Ramagiri Fort:

The below references are recorded in books and works of poets.1. Koravi Goparaju (15th century) in his 'Simhaasana Dwatrinshika' praises 'Nannayya' followed by a dedicated poem of 'Lemulawada's glory and Bhima', followed by Tikkana, Errana etc.'Lemulawadam jarinchu.. bhimudalathun

లేములవాడక శుచియై

లేములవాడం జరించు లేమలవాడం

దా మెఱసిన భీముని నుత

భీముని బల భీము విమత భీముని దలతున్

2. Ganapavarapu Venkata Kavi's (17th century) works refer to the poet as

'lemulawada bheema bhalire kavi sekhara saarvabhoumunemani yaanatichitini... lemulawada bheemudavalilaga..'లేములవాడ భీమ భళిరె కవి శెఖర సార్వభౌమునెమని యానతిచితిని...లేములవాడ భీముడవలీలగ.. '

Veturi Prabhakara sastry (1918) in the Prabandha Ratnavali book above also says in many other oral poems, he was referred as Lemulawada Bhima.

3. Some jester poets have appended some strange things to Kavijanasrayam's appendix. Scholars suggest that the assignment of a Vaidiki to a Jain author who belong to different centuries could be one of them. Notwithstanding the dubious authenticity, the poem is worth analyzing - the poet has blessings of Bhimeshwara of Vemulawada.

'vemulawadanu velasina bhimeshwara'

వేములవాడను వెలసిన

భీమెశ్వరకరుణగల్గు భీమనకవి నే

4.The one and only Lemulawada is nothing but Vemulawada, Karimnagar district. There exists a powerful Bhimeshwara temple (complex built by Baddega in 850-900 AD) near the popular Rajeshwara Devasthanam. The place and Lord Raja Rajeshwara were alternatively referred as 'Dakshavatyam Bhima lingam''' in Kshetra Mahatmyam.5. 'I also hold, for the reasons detailed in the Telugu preface, that Bhima was a native of Vemulavada (alias Lemulavada) in the Karimnagar district of H.H. The Nizam's dominions and not, as supposed by some, of a village of that name near Draksharama in the Godavery District - J.Ramayya Pantulu6. Other apocryphal references:

lEmulawaaDa Bhimunavaleelanu joochi kaLinga gangu taa

లేములవాడ భిమునవలీలను జూచి కళింగ గంగు తా

Chitrakutam

నేనే వేములవాడ భీమ కవి నేనిం జిత్రకూటంబు లో

భూన వ్యాపిత పల్లవోధ్భవ మహా పుష్పోప గుఛంబులన్

నానా పక్వ ఫలప్రదాయివగుమాయకల్ప వృక్షకృతిన్''References to Vemulawada of East Godavari district

There is an apocryphal reference to Daksharamam and Bheemeswara Temple. The same poem was amended by multiple authors. Notwithstanding the dubious authenticity, the poems points the poet to be the son of Lord Bheemeswara. Veturi Prabhakara Sastry calls out the reference to Daksharamam should not be taken in the literal sense since Palkuriki Somana calls himself as 'son of Basava' although his real parents are different.

Story of Vemulawada Bheemakavi 

ఘనుఁడన్ వేములవాడ వంశజుఁడ దక్షారామ భీమేశ నం దనుడన్ 
దివ్య విషామృత ప్రకట నానా కావ్య ధుర్యుండ భీమన నా పేరు వినంగ చెప్పితిన్
కస్తూరికాది ఘనసారధి సుగంధ వస్తువులు వేఘన్ తెచ్చి లాలింపుమా

Nizam Andhra Sabha 
In memory of this great poet, the Nizam Andhra Sabha of 1935 organized in Sircilla called the venue of the meeting as 'Bhima Kavi Nagar'.

Literature 
He lived after Nannayya Bhatta and prior to Tikkanna. He composed many poetic works in the Chaatuvu style. He is known to have written Raghava Pandeeveeyam, Nrusimha Puranam which are not available. He is also known for his work Kavijanasrayam, a prosody which is now ruled out to be written by him.

References

Year of death unknown
Telugu poets